Lars "Jimmy" Morgan Nordin (born 19 October 1979 in Falun) is a Swedish folk singer and ex-shot putter. His biggest athletics achievements were the finals of the 2002 European Indoor Championships and 2002 European Championships.

He is a seven-time Swedish national shot put champion (1999–2002, 2004–2006). His shot put personal best of 20.73 metres, set in 2002, puts him third on the Swedish all-time list.

Athletics competition record

Personal bests
Outdoor
Shot put – 20.73 (Ludvika 2002)
Discus throw – 47.37 (Karlstad 2005)
Indoor
Shot put – 19.96 (Malmö 2001)

References

1979 births
Living people
People from Falun
Swedish male shot putters
Swedish folk singers
21st-century Swedish singers